Balkrishna Vithaldas Doshi OAL (26 August 192724 January 2023) was an Indian architect. He is an important figure in Indian architecture and noted for his contributions to the evolution of architectural discourse in India. Having worked under Le Corbusier and Louis Kahn, he was a pioneer of modernist and brutalist architecture in India.

His noteworthy designs include FLAME University, IIM Bangalore, IIM Udaipur, NIFT Delhi, Amdavad ni Gufa, CEPT University, and the Aranya Low Cost Housing development in Indore for which was awarded the Aga Khan Award for Architecture.

In 2018, he became the first Indian architect to receive the Pritzker Architecture Prize. He was also awarded the Padma Shri, the Padma Bhushan, the Padma Vibhushan,  and the Royal Institute of British Architects' Royal Gold Medal for 2022.

Early life
Doshi was born to a Gujarati Vaishnav Hindu family in Pune. His mother died when he was 10 months old and his father remarried, with his grandfather and aunts helping raise him. At the age of eleven, he was injured in a fire accident, and thereafter walked with a slight limp. He studied at the Sir J. J. School of Art in Mumbai between 1947 and 1950.

Career

Early projects
In 1950, he went to Europe. He worked closely with Le Corbusier on the latter's projects in Paris between 1951 and 1954. In 1954, he returned to India to supervise Corbusier's buildings in Ahmedabad, which included the Villa Sarabhai, Villa Shodhan, Mill Owners' Association Building, and Sanskar Kendra. Corbusier is described as having been a major influence on Doshi's later work.

His studio, Vastu-Shilpa (environmental design), was established in 1955. Doshi worked closely with Louis Kahn and Anant Raje, when Kahn designed the campus of the Indian Institute of Management, Ahmedabad. In 1958 he was a fellow at the Graham Foundation for Advanced Studies in the Fine Arts. He then started the School of Architecture (S.A) in 1962.

Bimanagar 
Bimanagar Housing Society, located at Ahmedabad is one of the well-known project by Shri B.V Doshi. He once said, "One of my most favourite housing projects is the one I designed for Life Insurance Corporation, at Ahmedabad. Here I knew that the houses would be occupied by several generations of the same family, that they would identify with it, that there will be a strong sense of belonging and that their needs will change, and they may modify parts of it.”

Teaching
Apart from his international fame as an architect, Doshi is equally known for having been an educator and institution builder. He was the founding director of the School of Architecture, Ahmedabad (1962–72), founding director of the School of Planning (1972–79), founding dean of the Centre for Environmental Planning and Technology (1972–81), founding member of the Visual Arts Centre, Ahmedabad, and founding director of the Kanoria Centre for Arts, Ahmedabad.

Doshi was instrumental in establishing the nationally- and internationally-known research institute Vastu-Shilpa Foundation for Studies and Research in Environmental Design. The institute has performed pioneering work in low-cost housing and city planning. He is noteworthy for his pioneering work on low-income housing, and for his designs that incorporate concepts of sustainability in innovative ways.

Media
In 2008, Hundredhands director Premjit Ramachandran released a documentary interviewing Doshi. He appeared as himself in Mani Ratnam's O Kadhal Kanmani and Shaad Ali's Ok Jaanu.

Style 
Doshi said that he had been inspired by historic Indian monuments, as well as the work of European and American architects.

Personal life and death 
Doshi married Kamala Parikh in 1955. They had three daughters – Tejal, Radhika, and Maneesha. Tejal Panthaki is a textile designer, Radhika Kathpalia is an architect and fashion designer, and Maneesha Akkitham is a painter.

Doshi died in Ahmedabad, Gujarat on 24 January 2023, at age 95.

Recognition
Doshi was a fellow of the Royal Institute of British Architects and sat on the selection committee for the Pritzker Prize, the Indira Gandhi National Centre for the Arts, and the Aga Khan Award for Architecture. He was also a fellow of the Indian Institute of Architects.

Doshi's work on the reunification of Indian and English heritages through his practice was awarded a Global Award for Sustainable Architecture in 2007, the award's first edition. The award recognized Doshi's significant step in the direction of an alternative development model.

In March 2018, Doshi was awarded the Pritzker Architecture Prize, the Nobel equivalent for the field, thus becoming the first Indian to receive the honour. The Pritzker jury announced that Doshi "has always created an architecture that is serious, never flashy or a follower of trends", and noted his "deep sense of responsibility and a desire to contribute to his country and its people through high quality, authentic architecture".

 Padma Vibhushan (posthumous), Government of India, 2023 
 Royal Gold Medal, Royal Gold Medal for Architecture, Government of United Kingdom, 2022
 Padma Bhushan, Government of India, 2020
 Dhirubhai Thakar Savyasachi Saraswat Award, 2017
Pritzker Architecture Prize, 2018
Global Award for Sustainable Architecture, 2007 (first edition)
 Padma Shri, Government of India, 1976
 Honorary doctorate from the University of Pennsylvania
 Officer of the Order of Arts and Letters, France, 2011
6th Aga Khan Award for Architecture for Aranya Community Housing, 1993–1995

Buildings
 
1962 – Institute of Indology, Ahmedabad
1966 – Centre for Environment and Planning Technology (CEPT), Ahmedabad
1967 – Tagore Memorial Hall, Ahmedabad
1972 – ECIL Township, Hyderabad.
1973 – IFFCO township, Kalol
1976 – Premabhai Hall, Ahmedabad
1977 – Indian Institute of Management, Bangalore
1979 – Sangath, B. V. Doshi's office, Ahmedabad
1979 – Shakti Bhavan, Administrative Office of M. P. Electricity Board, Jabalpur
1979 – Mahatma Gandhi Labour Institute
1982 – Aranya Low Cost Housing, Indore
1984 – Vidyadhar Nagar, Jaipur
1989 – National Institute of Fashion Technology, Delhi
1990 – Amdavad ni Gufa, Ahmedabad
1997 – Sawai Gandharva Smarak, Pune
2002 – Udayan the Condoville, Udita (HIG), Utsav (MIG) Utsarg (LIG) 2500 homes, Kolkata

References

Further reading
 Curtis, William J. R., Balikrishna Doshi: An Architecture for India, Rizzoli, New York 1988, 
 James Steel, The Complete Architecture of Balikrishna Doshi, Rethinking Modernism for the Developing World, Thames and Hudson, London 1998, 
 Bruno Melotto ed., Balkrishna Doshi. Sangath. Indian architecture between tradition and modernity, Maggioli Editore, Santarcangelo di Romagna 2012, 
 Bruno Melotto ed., Balkrishna Doshi. The Masters in India. Le Corbusier, Louis Kahn and the Indian Context, Maggioli Editore, Santarcangelo di Romagna 2014,

External links

Vāstu Shilpā Consultants

Interview with DD Bharati on YouTube: Part-1 and Part-2
Texts, Interviews and Projects by B. V. Doshi on Architexturez South Asia
27th Annual Architecture Lecture at the Royal Academy of Arts on YouTube

1927 births
2023 deaths
Recipients of the Padma Bhushan in other fields
Gujarati people
20th-century Indian architects
Artists from Pune
Recipients of the Padma Shri in science & engineering
Members of the American Academy of Arts and Letters
Officiers of the Ordre des Arts et des Lettres
Indian urban planners
Pritzker Architecture Prize winners
People from Ahmedabad
Indian architects
Recipients of the Royal Gold Medal
Recipients of the Padma Vibhushan in other fields